Tiesj Benoot (born 11 March 1994) is a Belgian cyclist, who currently rides for UCI WorldTeam .

Career

Lotto–Soudal (2015–19)
Benoot turned professional with the Belgian UCI World Tour team  in 2015, after riding for the  outfit in 2013 and 2014, and riding some races as a stagiaire in autumn 2014.

Benoot made an instant impact in the professional ranks by placing fifth in his first Tour of Flanders. Later in the season he showed his abilities in stage races, finishing second overall behind Greg Van Avermaet at the 2015 Tour of Belgium. He also claimed three top-10 finishes in stages of the Critérium du Dauphiné.

Benoot showed climbing ability at the 2017 Critérium du Dauphiné, where he finished 12th overall. In June 2017, he was named in the startlist for the 2017 Tour de France. Benoot finished 20th overall in his first Grand Tour.

Benoot won his first professional race in March 2018, soloing to victory in the UCI World Tour's Strade Bianche in torrential rain after attacking from a chasing group to catch leaders Romain Bardet and Wout van Aert before dropping them in the final sector of dirt roads. Benoot soloed to victory by 39 seconds ahead of Bardet.

In August 2018, he was named in the startlist for the 2018 Vuelta a España.

Team Sunweb (2020–21)
In August 2019, Benoot signed an initial two-year deal with  starting from 2020. He finished second overall at the 2020 Paris–Nice, winning a stage and the points classification. Following the COVID-19 pandemic-enforced suspension of racing, Benoot took top-ten finishes at Liège–Bastogne–Liège (eighth) and the Tour of Flanders (tenth). He also extended his contract with the team until the end of the 2022 season in August 2020. Benoot took no wins in 2021, with a best result of fifth overall at Paris–Nice.

Team Jumbo–Visma
In December 2021, Benoot was released from his  contract a year early, and subsequently signed a two-year deal with  starting from 2022. He made his first start with the team at February's Omloop Het Nieuwsblad, and recorded his first top-ten finish with ninth at the E3 Saxo Bank Classic the following month. He finished second at Dwars door Vlaanderen, having attacked the lead group in the final two kilometres, before being out-sprinted by Mathieu van der Poel at the finish in Waregem. The following weekend, Benoot finished third in the Amstel Gold Race, having attacked from the main group in the final kilometre of the race. Team Jumbo-Visma had a historic performance in the 2022 Tour de France. Benoot played a key role supporting the team leaders, especially as injuries and abandons took their toll throughout the race. He survived the race and crossed the finish line in triumph with his surviving teammates.

Personal life
Outside of cycling, Benoot studied economics at Ghent University.

Benoot's uncommon first name derives from American singer/songwriter Tish Hinojosa, due to his parents' affinity with both the music and the first name of the artist.

Major results

2011
 7th Overall Tour du Valromey
2012
 2nd Overall Junior Oberösterreichrundfahrt
1st  Points classification
1st Stage 2
 3rd Time trial, National Junior Road Championships
 3rd Overall Trophée Centre Morbihan
 5th Bernaudeau Junior
 6th Overall GP Général Patton
 8th Overall Liège–La Gleize
 8th Overall Keizer der Juniores
1st Stage 1
2013
 1st Tour de Moselle
 2nd Overall Vuelta a Palencia
1st Stage 4
 4th Overall Circuit des Ardennes
1st  Points classification
1st  Young rider classification
 8th Grand Prix des Marbriers
 8th Liège–Bastogne–Liège Espoirs
 10th Overall Vuelta a la Comunidad de Madrid Under-23
1st  Young rider classification
1st Stage 2
2014
 2nd Overall Le Triptyque des Monts et Châteaux
1st  Points classification
 3rd Overall Ronde de l'Isard
1st  Young rider classification
 3rd Ronde van Vlaanderen Beloften
 4th Road race, UCI Under-23 Road World Championships
 4th Grote Prijs Stad Zottegem
 5th Liège–Bastogne–Liège Espoirs
 5th Flèche Ardennaise
 6th Road race, UEC European Under-23 Road Championships
 8th Binche–Chimay–Binche
 10th Overall Danmark Rundt
2015
 2nd Overall Tour of Belgium
 3rd Handzame Classic
 4th Le Samyn
 4th Paris–Tours
 5th Tour of Flanders
 5th Grand Prix Cycliste de Montréal
 6th Overall World Ports Classic
 6th Ronde van Zeeland Seaports
 6th Dwars door Vlaanderen
 6th Druivenkoers Overijse
 8th Overall Eneco Tour
 8th Trofeo Serra de Tramuntana
2016
 1st  Young rider classification, Volta ao Algarve
 3rd Trofeo Serra de Tramuntana
 3rd Omloop Het Nieuwsblad
 4th Trofeo Pollenca–Port de Andratx
 5th Overall Tour de Pologne
 6th Grand Prix de Wallonie
 7th E3 Harelbeke
 7th Brussels Cycling Classic
 8th Strade Bianche
 9th Heistse Pijl
2017
 3rd Brabantse Pijl
 3rd Trofeo Pollenca–Port de Andratx
 4th Kuurne–Brussels–Kuurne
 4th Grand Prix de Wallonie
 7th Overall Tour of Belgium
 7th Dwars door Vlaanderen
 8th Overall Volta ao Algarve
1st  Young rider classification
 8th Strade Bianche
 8th Trofeo Serra de Tramuntana
 8th Vuelta a Murcia
 9th Clásica de San Sebastián
2018
 1st Strade Bianche
 3rd Brabantse Pijl
 4th Overall Tirreno–Adriatico
1st  Young rider classification
 5th E3 Harelbeke
 5th Tour de l'Eurométropole
 6th Overall Vuelta a San Juan
 6th Paris–Tours
 7th Dwars door Vlaanderen
 8th Tour of Flanders
2019
 1st Stage 1 Danmark Rundt
 2nd Bretagne Classic
 4th Overall Tour de Suisse
 4th Milano–Torino
 5th Strade Bianche
 5th Dwars door Vlaanderen
 6th Tre Valli Varesine
 9th Overall Tour of Britain
 9th Tour of Flanders
 10th Overall Vuelta a San Juan
  Combativity award Stage 9 Tour de France
2020
 2nd Overall Paris–Nice
1st  Points classification
1st Stage 6
 8th Liège–Bastogne–Liège
 10th Tour of Flanders
2021
 5th Overall Paris–Nice
 7th Liège–Bastogne–Liège
 8th Overall Benelux Tour
 9th Grand Prix de Wallonie
 10th Antwerp Port Epic
2022
 2nd Dwars door Vlaanderen
 3rd Amstel Gold Race
 3rd Clásica de San Sebastián
 9th E3 Saxo Bank Classic
2023
 1st Kuurne–Brussels–Kuurne
 3rd Strade Bianche

General classification results timeline

Classics results timeline

References

External links

 
 
 
 
 
 
 
 

1994 births
Living people
Belgian male cyclists
Sportspeople from Ghent
Cyclists from East Flanders
Olympic cyclists of Belgium
Cyclists at the 2020 Summer Olympics
European Games competitors for Belgium
Cyclists at the 2015 European Games